Suzana Golja (Golja-Zulijani) is a Croatian former handball player. 

She was born in Labin, Istria (today Croatia, at the time SR Croatia in SFR Yugoslavia). Golja started playing with local club ŽRK Rudar Labin. 

She played for Norwegian club Junkeren in the Eliteserien in the 1990s.

Golja was a player of the Croatian national handball team.

References

Croatian female handball players
Year of birth missing (living people)
People from Labin